MacLane is a surname. Notable people with the surname include:
Angus MacLane, American animator, screenwriter, and voice actor
Barton MacLane (1902–1969), American actor, playwright and screenwriter
Evan MacLane (born 1982), American baseball player
Mary MacLane (1881–1929), Canadian-born American writer
Saunders Mac Lane (1909–2005), American mathematician

See also

 John McClane, fictional character
 MacLaine surnames
 McLaine surnames
 McLain surnames
 McLane